The Max Planck Institute for Evolutionary Anthropology (shortened to MPI EVA) is a research institute based in Leipzig, Germany, that was founded in 1997. It is part of the Max Planck Society network.

Well-known scientists currently based at the institute include founding director Svante Pääbo and Johannes Krause (genetics), Christophe Boesch (primatology), Jean-Jacques Hublin (human evolution), Richard McElreath (evolutionary ecology), and Russell Gray (linguistic and cultural evolution).

Departments 
The institute comprises six departments, several Research Groups, and The Leipzig School of Human Origins. Currently, approximately 375 people are employed at the institute. The former department of Linguistics, which existed from 1998 to 2015, was closed in May 2015, upon the retirement of its director, Bernard Comrie. The former department of Developmental and Comparative Psychology operated from 1998 to 2018 under director Michael Tomasello.

 Department of Archeogenetics (Johannes Krause)

 Department of Comparative Cultural Psychology (Daniel Haun)

Department of Evolutionary Genetics (Svante Pääbo)
Neandertals and More (Svante Pääbo)
Human Population History (Mark Stoneking)
The Minerva Research Group for Bioinformatics (Janet Kelso)
Advanced DNA sequencing techniques (Matthias Meyer)
Max Planck Research Group on Single Cell Genomics (Barbara Treutlein)
Genetic Diversity through Space and Time (Ben Peter)

Department of Human Behavior, Ecology and Culture (Richard McElreath)
Comparative Behavioral Ecology
Theory in Cultural Evolution Lab
Taï Chimpanzee Project (Roman Wittig)
ERC - Ape Attachment Project (Catherine Crockford)
Evolution of Brain Connectivity

Department of Human Evolution (Jean-Jacques Hublin)

Department of Linguistic and Cultural Evolution (Russell Gray)

Neanderthal genome 

In July 2006, the Max Planck Institute for Evolutionary Anthropology and 454 Life Sciences announced that they would be sequencing the Neanderthal genome. Results of the study were published in the May 2010 journal Science detailing an initial draft of the Neanderthal genome based on the analysis of four billion base pairs of Neanderthal DNA. It was thought that a comparison of the Neanderthal genome and human genome would expand our understanding of Neanderthals, as well as the evolution of humans and human brains. The study determined that some mixture of genes occurred between Neanderthals and anatomically modern humans and presented evidence that elements of their genome remain in that of non-African modern humans.

DNA researcher Svante Pääbo tested more than 70 Neanderthal specimens and found only one that had enough DNA to sample. Preliminary DNA sequencing from a 38,000-year-old bone fragment from a femur found in 1980 at Vindija Cave in Croatia shows that Neanderthals and Homo sapiens share about 99.5% of their DNA. It is believed that the two species shared a common ancestor about 500,000 years ago. The authors of the Nature article have calculated that the two species diverged about 516,000 years ago, whereas fossil records show a time of about 400,000 years ago. From DNA records, scientists hope to confirm or deny the theory that there was interbreeding between the species.

Early Homo sapiens 

Dating carried out by the Max Planck Institute for Evolutionary Anthropology in Leipzig revealed that the Jebel Irhoud site and its Homo sapiens fossils were far older than first thought. Fresh excavations revealed the remains of at least five people and a number of stone tools. The finds included part of a skull, a jawbone, teeth, and limb bones that had come from three adults, a juvenile, and a child aged about seven and a half years old.
The bones looked similar facially to those of humans today, but had much larger lower jaws and elongated braincases. They have similar features to a skull dating to 260,000 years ago that was found at the other end of the continent, in Florisbad, South Africa, which has been attributed to Homo sapiens on the basis of the Jebel Irhoud finds.

The tools were found alongside gazelle bones and lumps of charcoal, indicating the presence of fire and probably of cooking in the cave. The gazelle bones showed characteristic signs of butchery and cooking, such as cut marks, notches consistent with marrow extraction, and charring. Some of the tools had been burned due to fires being lit on top of them, presumably after they had been discarded. This enabled the researchers to use thermoluminescence dating to ascertain when the burning had happened, and by proxy, the age of the fossil bones, which were found in the same deposit layer. The burnt tools were dated to approximately 315,000 years ago, indicating that the fossils are of about the same age. This conclusion was confirmed by recalculating the age of the Irhoud 3 mandible, which produced an age range compatible with that of the tools, at roughly 280,000 to 350,000 years old. As of 2017, this would make the remains the earliest known examples of Homo sapiens.

This suggests that, rather than modern humans arising in East Africa approximately 200,000 years ago, it appears that humans may already have been present across the length of Africa 100,000 years earlier. According to Jean-Jacques Hublin, "The idea is that early Homo sapiens dispersed around the continent and elements of human modernity appeared in different places, and so different parts of Africa contributed to the emergence of what we call modern humans today." Early humans may have comprised a large, interbreeding population dispersed across Africa whose spread was facilitated by a wetter climate that created a "green Sahara", approximately 300,000 to 330,000 years ago. The rise of modern humans may thus have taken place on a continental scale, rather than being confined to a particular corner of Africa.

World Atlas of Language Structures 

In 2005, the World Atlas of Language Structures, a project of the institute's former department of Linguistics, was published. The atlas consists of more than 140 maps, each displaying a particular language feature – for example order of adjective and noun – for between 120 and 1370 languages of the world. In 2008 the atlas was also published online and the underlying database made freely available.

They also used to maintain the Glottolog until 2015, when it was taken over by the Max Planck Institute for the Science of Human History in Jena.

Early childhood language acquisition 

Researchers at the institute have developed a computer model analyzing early toddler conversations to predict the structure of later conversations. They showed that toddlers develop their own individual rules for speaking with slots into which they could put certain kinds of words. The rules inferred from toddler speech were better predictors of subsequent speech than traditional grammars.

See also 
 Max Planck Institute for the Science of Human History

References

External links 
 Homepage of the Max Planck Institute for Evolutionary Anthropology